The 1983 Jordanian  League (known as The Jordanian  League, was the 33rd season of Jordan League since its inception in 1944. Al-Faisaly won its  18th title.

Teams

Map

Overview
Al-Faysali won the championship.

League standings

 no team relegated because the Football Association decided to increase the number of clubs to 12 teams in the 1984 season.

References
RSSSF

Jordanian Pro League seasons
Jordan
Jordan
football